Nava is a city and seat of Nava Municipality, in the north-eastern Mexican state of Coahuila.

References

Populated places in Coahuila